Pool D of the 2022 Billie Jean King Cup Americas Zone Group II was one of four pools in the Americas zone of the 2022 Billie Jean King Cup. Five teams competed in a round robin competition, with each team proceeding to their respective sections of the play-offs: the top team played for advancement to Group I in 2023.

Standings 

Standings are determined by: 1. number of wins; 2. number of matches; 3. in two-team ties, head-to-head records; 4. in three-team ties, (a) percentage of matches won (head-to-head records if two teams remain tied), then (b) percentage of sets won (head-to-head records if two teams remain tied), then (c) percentage of games won (head-to-head records if two teams remain tied), then (d) Billie Jean King Cup rankings.

Round-robin

Uruguay vs. Barbados

Honduras vs. Costa Rica

Uruguay vs. Honduras

Costa Rica vs. Jamaica

Uruguay vs. Jamaica

Honduras vs. Barbados

Uruguay vs. Costa Rica

Barbados vs. Jamaica

Honduras vs. Jamaica

Costa Rica vs. Barbados

References

External links 
 Billie Jean King Cup website

2022 Billie Jean King Cup Americas Zone